Albertskroon is a suburb of Johannesburg, South Africa. It is located in Region 4.

History
The suburb is named after the previous landowner and descendants of Hendrick Abraham Alberts. The word Kroon in its name refers to a crown of a hill. The land is situated on the portion of an old Witwatersrand farm called Waterval around 1896.

References

Johannesburg Region B